NY Racing Team (formerly Xxxtreme Motorsport and Team Xtreme Racing) is an American professional stock car racing team in the NASCAR Cup Series. The team is owned by John Cohen, who is one of the few African-Americans to have owned a NASCAR team in a major touring series. In 2022, NY Racing Team fielded the No. 44 Chevrolet Camaro ZL1 1LE part-time for Greg Biffle, with car bodies supplied by Richard Childress Racing and engines by Hendrick Motorsports.

Background
Johnathan "John" Cohen (born in 1975) is an African-American entrepreneur and team owner from New Jersey. Cohen began his business interests in nightclubs and taverns, before forming his race team, Xxxtreme Motorsport in the spring of 2009.

NASCAR Cup Series

Car No. 7 history

2018
On May 21, 2018, it was announced the team would be returning to the Cup Series for the Coca-Cola 600 for the first time since 2015, receiving a multi-year deal with Steakhouse Elite as a sponsor. J. J. Yeley was announced to drive the No. 7 car in a partnership with Premium Motorsports. After qualifying 40th, Yeley finished 38th after suffering from fuel pump issues on lap 191. The following week at Pocono they fielded a car in association with Premium Motorsports. Yeley qualified the car 37th and finished 32nd. After missing several races, the team returned to the track for the Coke Zero Sugar 400 in collaboration with BK Racing. Yeley drove the Steakhouse Elite No. 23 to an 18th place finish after starting 40th. The following week at Kentucky they finished 38th. After skipping the New Hampshire race, the team finished 28th at Pocono after starting 20th. After missing two more events, the team returned, in partnership with Premium, at Bristol. Yeley brought the No. 7 car home in 34th place. The team's collaboration with the No. 23 team continued after Front Row Motorsports' purchase of the No. 23 charter. Yeley drove the car to a 17th place finish at Las Vegas.

NY Racing continued its partnership with Front Row Motorsports after the purchase of BK's charter. During the autumn Talladega race, the No. 23 team switched manufacturers from Toyota to Ford before switching back to Toyota for the next two races. Yeley continued being the driver of the No. 23 Toyota for the rest of the season and during the final race at Homestead-Miami Speedway, BK Racing operated as a Ford Fusion. With BK Racing officially shutting down at season's end and being absorbed into Front Row Motorsports, NY Racing and Front Row Motorsports ended their partnership.

For 2019, NY Racing planned to run a No. 7 Steakhouse Elite Ford Mustang with Yeley as the driver, but they ended up never making an attempt.

Car No. 7 results

Car No. 30 history

2014
Before the 2014 Richmond spring race, the team purchased the owner points and assets of the recently defunct No. 30 from Swan Racing, including their race shop in Statesville, North Carolina, hoping to end their recent struggles in qualifying by having a solid points base.  The team used No. 30 for Richmond due to NASCAR rules regarding ownership transfers, but switched back to the No. 44 thereafter.

Car No. 44 history

2012–2015 

The team returned from hiatus and began running the Cup Series in November 2012. A car numbered 44 for David Reutimann was fielded at the 2012 AdvoCare 500 at Phoenix International Raceway with sponsorship from No Label Watches. Reutimann finished 40th, pulling out of the race early due to a vibration.

For 2013, Scott Riggs was hired as the team's full-time driver and the team switched manufacturers from Chevrolet to Ford. The team attempted most races in the first half of the season, but following numerous instances of having to start and park, coupled with poor sponsorship, the team shut down for the year midseason, and Riggs moved to RBR Enterprises in the Camping World Truck Series.

In 2014, J. J. Yeley moved to the team following his departure from Tommy Baldwin Racing. The team struggled for speed early in the season, failing to qualify for two races and withdrawing from two others. The team qualified for Richmond after the field was set by the rulebook due to rain, but were running four laps down when the engine expired on lap 384. In May, after failing to qualify for the Aaron's 499 in the All City Leasing & Warehousing Chevrolet SS, the team qualified for the 5-hour Energy 400 on speed in the Phoenix Warehouse Chevrolet SS, starting the race in the 35th position. However, they once again suffered an engine failure, finishing 41st. They then missed the Coca-Cola 600, and blew their third engine at Dover.  The next week at Pocono, despite cutting down a tire mid-race, they were able to stay on the track and complete a race for the first time in their existence, finishing 38th. An incident-free race the next week at Michigan brought the team's best finish to that point, 36th, which they then bested again at Sonoma with a 34th. The team then withdrew from Kentucky in the midst of more personnel shuffling. The team was absent for most of the summer, returning as "Team Xtreme Racing" in September for the AAA 400 at Dover, with Timmy Hill as driver. The team made the race, but lost an engine early into the event.

Former Tommy Baldwin Racing driver Reed Sorenson was signed by the team to compete in the 2015 Daytona 500 with Golden Corral sponsorship. Despite crashing on the final lap Sorenson was able to cross the start-finish line to record the team's first lead-lap finish, in 32nd place. Travis Kvapil was scheduled to drive the car in Atlanta, but they were forced to withdraw after the car, truck and hauler were stolen from a hotel parking lot. The race car and truck that was hauling the trailer have been recovered. The trailer and spare racing parts remain missing.

After Kvapil failed to qualify for the next three races, combined with Cohen facing his own civil arrest warrant for not answering an information subpoena, the team announced that they would withdraw from Martinsville in order to better prepare for Texas; however, they have not returned to the series since. On August 3, Jason Terry pleaded guilty in the theft of the Team Xtreme truck and trailer. Since then, the No. 44 became available and was later used by Richard Petty Motorsports for Brian Scott.

In December of 2020, the NY Racing Team posted "44" on their Instagram page, indicating their possible return to Cup. They would later say they would skip the Daytona 500. However, the team failed to show up to any races in the 2021 season.

2022 

In 2022, the NY Racing Team made their Cup Series return with Greg Biffle at the Daytona 500, marking the team's first race in four years and Biffle's first Cup race in six years. For this season, the team switched from Ford to Chevrolet, with primary sponsorship from various colleges. The team finished the race in 36th place. The No. 44 also ran at Las Vegas and finished 34th. The team achieved their first top-20 finish at Atlanta, finishing 20th.

Car No. 44 results

Nationwide Series

Car No. 07 history
The team debuted in the Xfinity Series during the 2009 season, running part-time with sponsorship from Macy's and Cavi Clothing sharing the owner points with SKI Motorsports. The car debuted at Daytona in July with Chase Austin behind the wheel, the team returned at IRP, Bristol and Atlanta.

Car No. 58 history
The team debuted in the Xfinity Series during the 2009 season, running part-time with sponsorship from Macy's and Cavi Clothing. Xxxtreme ran first at Daytona in July with Mike Harmon, followed by several runs with Josh Wise and Chase Austin during the second half of the season.

The team temporarily shut down at the end of the season after Macy's and Cavi left the team and no sponsorship could be found for 2010.

References

External links
 
 
 Official NY Racing Team Twitter account

American auto racing teams
Auto racing teams established in 2009
NASCAR controversies